Veronica Egebakken Kristiansen (born 10 July 1990) is a Norwegian handball player for Győri ETO KC and the Norwegian national team.

She made her team Norway debut in 2013.

She is the elder sister of handballer Jeanett Kristiansen and the younger sister of handballer Charlotte Kristiansen.

Achievements

National team
Olympic Games:
Bronze Medalist: 2016, 2020
World Championship:
Winner: 2015, 2021
Silver Medalist: 2017
European Championship:
Winner: 2014, 2016, 2020
Junior World Championship:
Winner: 2010
Junior European Championship:
Winner: 2009

European
EHF Champions League:
Winner: 2019
Finalist: 2022
Bronze medalist: 2021

Domestic
Norwegian League:
Silver: 2014/2015
Norwegian Cup:
Silver: 2010
Danish Championship:
Silver: 2015/2016
Bronze: 2016/2017
Danish Cup:
Winner: 2015
Finalist: 2016
Hungarian Championship
Winner: 2019, 2022
Hungarian Cup:
Winner: 2019, 2021

Individual awards
All-Star Left Back of Postenligaen: 2013/2014
All-Star Centre Back of Damehåndboldligaen: 2017/2018
Best Player of Damehåndboldligaen: 2017/2018
All-Star Centre Back of the EHF Champions League: 2018

Personal life
On 12 January 2023 it was announced that she is expecting her first child with her partner, Hungarian Ádám Devecseri, former canoeist and current physiotherapist of Győri ETO KC.

References

External links
 Veronica Egebakken Kristiansen at the Norwegian Handball Federation 
 
 
 
 

Norwegian female handball players
1990 births
Living people
Norwegian expatriate sportspeople in Denmark
Norwegian expatriate sportspeople in Hungary
Expatriate handball players
Handball players at the 2016 Summer Olympics
Olympic handball players of Norway
Olympic bronze medalists for Norway
Medalists at the 2016 Summer Olympics
Olympic medalists in handball
Győri Audi ETO KC players
Handball players at the 2020 Summer Olympics
Medalists at the 2020 Summer Olympics
Sportspeople from Stavanger
21st-century Norwegian women